Marcus Mah Yung Jian (born 2 April 1995) is a Malaysian footballer who plays as a forward for Malaysia Super League club Penang.

Career
A student of SMK BUD 4, Marcus began his youth career in 2011 with the Selangor Chinese football team for the Malaysian Chinese Football Association (MCFA) League. He were then invited to participate with Penang Chinese Recreation Club (CRC) Football Academy after being described as a highly talented player, he has managed to secure a private sponsorship for his trip.

In 2016, Marcus scored the winner in the final of the season's  MCFA Cup to deliver Selangor Chinese's maiden FA Cup triumph. Sweeter still for the side, Marcus emerged as the tournament's top scorer, having scored a total of seven goals in the tournament.

He was handed a professional contract to play for KL MOF FC in the Malaysia FAM League in 2017, then transferred to the football team of the DBKL SC onwards. He made his debut on 25 February 2018 in a 0–1 loss against Selangor United, coming on as an 75th-minute substitute. He later moved to Petaling Jaya City in 2019. After making three appearances for The Phoenix,  Marcus put pen to paper to a contract with Penang for the upcoming 2020 Malaysia Premier League.

Honours

Club 
Penang
Malaysia Premier League: 2020

References

External links
 

1995 births
People from Kuala Lumpur
Living people
Penang F.C. players
Malaysian footballers
Association football forwards
Malaysia Super League players
Malaysian people of Chinese descent